Seyyed Saleh may refer to:
 Seyyed Saleh, Khuzestan
 Seyyed Saleh, Kohgiluyeh and Boyer-Ahmad